The Team free routine competition of the synchronised swimming events at the 2015 World Aquatics Championships was held on 28 and 31 July 2015.

Results
The preliminary round was held on 28 July at 17:30.
The final was held on 31 July at 17:30.

Green denotes finalists

References

Team free routine